Gillian Kereldena Hadfield (born July 14, 1961) is a professor of law and of strategic management who is the inaugural Schwartz Reisman Chair in Technology and Society at the University of Toronto Faculty of Law. She is also director of the Schwartz Reisman Institute for Technology and Society. Previously, she was the Richard L. and Antoinette Schamoi Kirtland Professor of Law and Professor of Economics at the University of Southern California. At USC, Hadfield directed the Southern California Innovation Project and the USC Center in Law, Economics, and Organization. She is a former member of the board of directors for the American Law and Economics Association and the International Society for New Institutional Economics.

Education and early career
Hadfield received her BA with honours in economics from Queen's University in 1983. She earned a JD with distinction from Stanford Law School in 1988 and a PhD in economics from Stanford University in 1990.

Following law school, Hadfield clerked for Judge Patricia M. Wald of the U.S. Court of Appeals for the District of Columbia Circuit.

Academic career
Hadfield joined the faculty of the UC Berkeley School of Law as an assistant law professor in 1990. From 1994 to 1999, Hadfield was an associate law professor at the University of Toronto Law School, and then a professor of law from 1999 to 2001. Hadfield also served as a professor with NYU School of Law's Global Law Faculty from 1999 to 2001.

Hadfield moved to the USC Gould School of Law in 2001, where she was appointed the Richard L. and Antoinette Schamoi Kirtland Professor of Law and Professor of Economics at the University of Southern California, serving in the role to 2018.

In 2016, she was the Daniel R. Fischel and Sylvia M. Neil Distinguished visiting professor of Law at the University of Chicago Law School. In 2010, Hadfield was the Sidley Austin Visiting Professor at Harvard Law School, and in 2008, was the Justin W. D'Atri Visiting Professor of Law, Business, and Society at Columbia Law School. In 2006–2007 and 2010–2011, Hadfield served as a fellow of the Center for Advanced Study in the Behavioral Sciences at Stanford University, and in 1993, served as a National Fellow at the Hoover Institution.

In 2018, Hadfield rejoined the University of Toronto and in 2019 was appointed the Schwartz Reisman Chair in Technology and Society, as well as the director of the Schwartz Reisman Institute for Technology and Society.

Publications
Hadfield's work is widely published in law journals, including the Stanford Law Review, and in peer-reviewed journals, including the Annals of Internal Medicine, the Journal of Comparative Economics, the Journal of Economic Behavior and Organization, and the Annual Review of Law and Social Science.

References

External links 
 Profile at the University of Toronto Faculty of Law
 

Living people
Queen's University at Kingston alumni
University of Southern California faculty
Stanford University alumni
Stanford Law School alumni
New York University School of Law faculty
Center for Advanced Study in the Behavioral Sciences fellows
Hoover Institution people
Law and economics scholars
Academic staff of the University of Toronto Faculty of Law
1961 births
Canadian lawyers
Canadian economists
Lawyers in Ontario